The Vermont Senate is the upper house of the Vermont General Assembly, the state legislature of the U.S. state of Vermont. The senate consists of 30 members elected from multi-member districts. Each senator represents at least 20,300 citizens. Senators are elected to two-year terms and there is no limit to the number of terms that a senator may serve.

As in other upper houses of state and territorial legislatures and the U.S. Senate, the state senate of Vermont has special functions, such as confirming or rejecting gubernatorial appointments to executive departments, the state cabinet, commissions, and boards, as well as electing members to the Vermont Supreme Court.

The Vermont Senate meets at the Vermont State House in the state capital of Montpelier.

Districting and terms
The 30 Senators are elected from 16 single and multi-member senate districts. The districts largely correspond to the boundaries of the state's 14 counties with adjustments to ensure equality of representation. Each district elects between 1 and 3 senators at-large depending on population. For the 2023–2033 districts, Seven districts elect one senator each, four districts elect two each, and five elect three. Senators in multi-member districts are elected at-large throughout the district. Vermont is the only state to have any senate districts represented by more than two senators each, as well as the only state to employ bloc voting for senate elections.

Vermont is one of the 14 states where the upper house of its state legislature serves at a two-year cycle, rather than the more common four-year term in the majority of states.

Senate district lines are drawn with an eye toward adhering to the boundaries of the state's 14 counties, and the districts are named after the county or counties in which the bulk of the district is located. However, due to equal representation requirements of the federal and state constitutions, most districts do not have precisely the same boundaries as their respective counties, containing either one or more towns from neighboring counties or not containing one or more from their own county (or both).

Leadership
The Lieutenant Governor of Vermont serves as the President of the Senate, but casts a vote only if required to break a tie. In his or her absence, the President pro tempore presides over the Senate. The President pro tempore is elected by the majority party caucus followed by confirmation from the entire body through a Senate Resolution, and is the Senate's chief leadership position. The majority and minority leaders are elected by their respective party caucuses.

Committee assignments are determined by the Committee on Committees. This panel consists of the Lieutenant Governor, the President pro tempore and one member chosen by the full Senate. For several years the third member of the committee has been Richard Mazza.

Composition of the Senate (2021–2023 legislative session)

Current leadership

Current members

Operations
The full Senate meets Tuesday and Friday mornings only for the first seven weeks of the annual session.

The Vermont Senate is aided by an administrative staff, including the Secretary of the Vermont Senate and several assistants.  Since 2011, the Senate Secretary has been John H. Bloomer, a former member of the Senate. Previous secretaries include Ernest W. Gibson Jr., Murdock A. Campbell, and Franklin S. Billings Jr.

History

Vermont had a unicameral legislature until 1836; most of the functions normally performed by an upper legislative house were the responsibility of the governor and council. The state abolished the governor's council and added a senate by constitutional amendment.

The longest-serving member of the Vermont Senate was William T. Doyle; he was elected in 1968, reelected every two years until 2014, and defeated for reelection in 2016.  Doyle served from January 1969 to January 2017; no other legislator in Vermont history—member of the Vermont House, member of the Vermont Senate, or member of both the House and Senate—has served longer than Doyle.

Former districts, 2002–2022 
The following is from the Vermont Secretary of State.

Notable members
Most individuals who have served as governor or lieutenant governor had experience in the Vermont legislature; many served in the State Senate.  For more than 100 years from the 1850s to the 1960s, the Vermont Republican Party won every election for statewide office.  In keeping with the "Mountain Rule", which was created to ensure party unity, governors and lieutenant governors were from opposite sides of the Green Mountains, and were limited to two years in office.  Candidates for governor and lieutenant governor were agreed upon by party leaders years in advance, and were often chosen for leadership positions in the House or Senate to groom them for statewide office.

Governors
Governors who served in the Vermont Senate include: William A. Palmer (post-governorship); Horace Eaton; Carlos Coolidge (post-governorship); John S. Robinson; Ryland Fletcher; Frederick Holbrook; Paul Dillingham; George Whitman Hendee; John Wolcott Stewart; Julius Converse; Horace Fairbanks; Redfield Proctor; Roswell Farnham; John L. Barstow; Ebenezer J. Ormsbee; William P. Dillingham; Carroll S. Page; Levi K. Fuller; Josiah Grout; John G. McCullough; Charles J. Bell; Fletcher D. Proctor; George H. Prouty; John A. Mead; Allen M. Fletcher; Charles W. Gates; Percival W. Clement; Redfield Proctor Jr.; John E. Weeks; Stanley C. Wilson; Charles Manley Smith; William H. Wills; Mortimer R. Proctor; Lee E. Emerson; Joseph B. Johnson; Philip H. Hoff (post-governorship); Peter Shumlin; and Phil Scott (incumbent).

Members of Congress
Many of Vermont's members of the United States Senate and United States House of Representatives also served in the Vermont Senate.

U.S. Senators include Samuel S. Phelps, George F. Edmunds, Jonathan Ross, Porter H. Dale, Frank C. Partridge, Ernest Willard Gibson and Jim Jeffords.

U.S. House members who served in the Vermont Senate include William Henry, Ahiman Louis Miner, George Tisdale Hodges, Frederick E. Woodbridge, H. Henry Powers, David J. Foster, William Hebard, Andrew Tracy, William W. Grout, Kittredge Haskins, Frank Plumley, Alvah Sabin, Homer Elihu Royce, Worthington Curtis Smith, Bradley Barlow, Augustus Young, Richard W. Mallary, Peter Plympton Smith, Peter Welch and Becca Balint (incumbent).

Other notable members
Other notable members of the Vermont Senate include:
Jefferson P. Kidder (1847–1849): U.S. Congressman from Dakota Territory; Associate Justice of the Supreme Court of Dakota Territory.
Lucius E. Chittenden (1856–1860): author and government official.
Daniel Kellogg (1865–1866): Adjutant general of the Vermont Militia.
Hoyt Henry Wheeler (1868–1869): judge of the United States District Court for the District of Vermont.
William H. Gilmore (1882–1883): Adjutant general of the Vermont Militia.
William Wells (1886–1887): recipient of the Medal of Honor during the American Civil War.
Edna Beard (1923–1925): Vermont's first female state House member (1921 to 1923) and first female state senator; also the first woman to hold a leadership position in the Vermont legislature as Chair of the Senate Committee on Libraries.
Consuelo N. Bailey (1930–1931): Lieutenant Governor of Vermont from 1955 to 1957; first woman in the United States to be a lieutenant governor.
James L. Oakes (1961–1965): judge of the United States Court of Appeals for the Second Circuit.
David Zuckerman (born 1971): Lieutenant Governor of Vermont, 2017-2021.
Becca Balint (2015–present): first openly gay woman to serve in the Vermont Senate and first openly gay woman to hold a legislative leadership position as Senate Majority Leader.

See also
 President pro tempore of the Vermont Senate
 Vermont State House
 Vermont General Assembly
 Vermont House of Representatives
 Members of the Vermont Senate, 2005-2006 session
 Members of the Vermont Senate, 2007-2008 session
 Vermont Senate districts, 2012-2022
 Vermont Senate districts, 2022-2032

References

External links
Vermont General Assembly
Project Vote Smart - State Senate of Vermont
 Senate Map and Statistics 2012 Reapportionment

Politics of Vermont
State upper houses in the United States